A statue of Sun Yat-sen is installed in Chinatown, Los Angeles, in the U.S. state of California.

References

External links

 

Chinatown, Los Angeles
Cultural depictions of Sun Yat-sen
Monuments and memorials in California
Monuments and memorials to Sun Yat-sen
Outdoor sculptures in Greater Los Angeles
Sculptures of men in California
Statues in California